Valeria Cavalli (born 1 November 1959) is an Italian actress and model.

Selected filmography

External links 

 

Living people
Italian female models
1959 births
Italian film actresses
Italian television actresses
20th-century Italian actresses
21st-century Italian actresses
Models from Turin
Actors from Turin